SM U-30 was one of 329 U-boat submarines serving in the Imperial German Navy in World War I. She engaged in commerce warfare as part of the First Battle of the Atlantic.

Torpedoing of Gulflight

The particular mission when Gulflight  was attacked commenced 24 April 1915. On 28 April U-30 intercepted the  collier Mobile which she sank by gunfire after allowing the crew to escape. On 29 April she similarly sank the 3,220 GRT Cherbury. 30 April she ordered the steamer Fulgent to halt, but when the ship failed to do so fired a shot into the ship's bridge, which killed the captain and quartermaster. The ship stopped and the rest of the crew were allowed to escape before the ship was sunk by explosive charges placed inside. That afternoon, the 3,102 GRT Svorno was stopped and sunk. On 1 May the grain carrier Edale and French ship Europe were sunk.

The patrol ships  and  started to hunt for the submarine, but succeeded only in intercepting the US-flagged Gulflight, which they took under escort. The escort proved something of a disadvantage to Gulflight because she was obliged to slow down for the patrol and then, under international law, as a ship escorted by armed vessels became a legitimate target for attack. U-30 spotted the convoy and fired one torpedo at Gulflight, before noticing that she was flying an American flag. The submarine then broke off the attack in accordance with her instructions not to attack neutral vessels.

Gulflight survived the attack, although two members of the crew drowned while evacuating the ship and the master Captain Gunter died later that night from a heart attack. The ship was towed to Crow Bay and later repaired. News of the event would be overshadowed a few days later by the sinking of   but the incident, together with the attack on Lusitania and another ship, Cushing, formed the basis of a formal complaint from the US government to Germany. Although the United States remained officially neutral in the ongoing hostilities, it reached agreement with the German government that further attacks by submarine would be strictly in accordance with "cruiser Rules" as defined by international law.

Summary of raiding history

References

Notes

Citations

Bibliography

World War I submarines of Germany
1913 ships
Ships built in Danzig
U-boats commissioned in 1914
Type U 27 submarines